Carlos Mario Ramírez Botero (born October 26, 1994 in Manizales) is a Colombian cyclist, who last rode for UCI Continental team .

Major results
2014
 1st  Time trial, National Under-23 Road Championships
 Pan American Under-23 Road Championships
3rd Time trial
5th Road race
2016
 1st  Time trial, National Under-23 Road Championships
 2nd Time trial, Pan American Under-23 Road Championships

References

External links

1994 births
Living people
Colombian male cyclists
People from Manizales
21st-century Colombian people